William de Beauchamp, 9th Earl of Warwick (c. 1238 – 1298) was the eldest of eight children of William de Beauchamp of Elmley and his wife Isabel de Mauduit. He was an English nobleman and soldier, described as a “vigorous and innovative military commander."  He was active in the field against the Welsh for many years, and at the end of his life campaigned against the Scots.

Career
He became hereditary High Sheriff of Worcestershire for life on the death of his father in 1268. He was a close friend of Edward I of England, and was an important leader in Edward's invasion of Wales in 1277. 

In 1294, he raised the siege of Conwy Castle, where the King had been penned in, crossing the estuary. 

He was victorious on 5 March 1295 at the battle of Maes Moydog against the rebel prince of Wales, Madog ap Llywelyn. In a night attack on the Welsh infantry he used cavalry to drive them into compact formations which were then shot up by his archers and charged.

Family

His father was William (III) de Beauchamp of Elmley Castle, Worcestershire, and his mother was Isabel de Mauduit, sister and heiress of William Mauduit, 8th Earl of Warwick, from whom he inherited his title in 1268. He had a sister, Sarah, who married Richard Talbot. He had a brother, Walter de Beauchamp of Powyke & Alcester, (d. 1303) who married both Alice de Bohun & Alice de Toeni.

He married Maud FitzJohn. Their children included:
Isabella de Beauchamp, who married firstly Sir Patrick de Chaworth and, secondly, Hugh le Despenser, 1st Earl of Winchester
Guy de Beauchamp, 10th Earl of Warwick (c.1272-1315), who married Alice de Toeni, widow of Thomas de Leybourne and sister and heiress of Robert de Toeni/Tosny (d.1309), feudal baron of Flamstead in Hertfordshire.

Ancestry

References

1238 births
1298 deaths
13th-century English nobility
Earls of Warwick (1088 creation)
High Sheriffs of Worcestershire
William